The 1965 Campeonato Brasileiro Série A (officially the 1965 Taça Brasil) was the 7th edition of the Campeonato Brasileiro Série A.

Northern Zone

Northern Group

Northeastern Group

Northern Zone Decision

Southern Zone

Southern Group

Central Group

Southern Zone Decision

Preliminary Finals

Semifinals
Vasco da Gama and Santos enter in this stage

Finals

References

External links
1965 Taça Brasil

1965 in Brazilian football
Bra
Taça Brasil seasons
B